Rhinogobio nasutus is a species of cyprinid fish. It is endemic to the Yellow River in China.

It can grow to  total length.

References

nasutus
Cyprinid fish of Asia
Freshwater fish of China
Endemic fauna of China
Fish described in 1876
Taxa named by Karl Kessler